MechWarrior 2: Mercenaries is a video game released in September 1996 as a stand-alone expansion to MechWarrior 2: 31st Century Combat and the last BattleTech game made by Activision. In this game, the player takes control of an Inner Sphere mercenary squad, with control over finances and free choice of missions.

Gameplay

Far more BattleMechs are available than in MechWarrior 2: 31st Century Combat, as well as other vehicles (including a single mission where the player could use a hovertank). The player can hire an aerospace fighter to provide air cover.

Plot
Mercenaries covers the years of 3044 to 3052, ending with the Battle of Luthien. As such, it is a prequel to the other MechWarrior 2 games and includes missions pertaining to the Clan invasion.

The player can take contracts from one of four factions, the Draconis Combine (DC), the Federated Commonwealth (FC), ComStar (CS), or the Free Rasalhague Republic (FRR). Generally, the background plot is of the Draconis Combine and Federated Commonwealth making initial moves towards yet another war between the two great powers, with the FRR and CS trying to play both off against the middle. The backdrop for this is the aftermath of the War of 3039 between the two great powers (which was effectively a stalemate) and buildup by both sides towards the next war. The player can take contracts by both sides without censure from either, though doing so will cause time-limited contract openings to close if the player is already "booked".

Missions include helping (and crushing) uprisings, generally on behalf of the FC and DC respectively, deep recon and raids, anti-pirate campaigns, and even fights against other merc units. The player can also attempt to win the crown of Champion of Solaris in the Battlemech Games, inside massive enclosed arenas. These missions proved so popular that they were brought back in MechWarrior 4: Mercenaries.

The buildup to a war between the two Great Powers suddenly comes to a dramatic twist with the invasion of the Clans. The player is thrust into the battles against the "unknown mechs" of the Clans. For a time captured by Clan Wolf, the player escapes in a stolen hovertank and returns to the Inner Sphere to fight in some of the most pivotal battles of the invasion, such as the Battle of Wolcott (which is represented inaccurately as a multi-day campaign rather than a multi-minute ambush) as well as the climactic Invasion of Luthien.

The game ends with a cutscene of the Battle of Tukayyid with a lance from the Com Guards, led by Comstar's Precentor Martial Anastasius Focht, destroying a Clan Star.

Development
The developers had little choice but to make the game a prequel, since FASA would not allow Activision to use any time period in the Battletech universe beyond that already covered by the expansion MechWarrior 2: Ghost Bear's Legacy.

The MechWarrior 2 engine was still used but with upgraded graphics with terrain texture mapping and enhanced lighting effects and higher resolutions. A completely new musical score was devised for the game as well as an updated version of NetMech, called MercNet, which included native Internet-playing ability.

Reception

In Computer Games Strategy Plus, Tom Chick criticized Mercenaries performance and stability, and called it "clearly a game rushed out the doors and onto the shelves before it's ready." He also found fault with the game's multiplayer feature and artificial intelligence. However, Chick concluded, "In spite of these (considerable) drawbacks, Activision has done an admirable job taking their Mechwarrior engine to the next level." Conversely, Bernard H. Yee of PC Magazine wrote, "With its new resource management requirements, its cutthroat attitude, and its free online hooks, MechWarrior 2: Mercenaries is the most complete, fun and addictive game in the MechWarrior series."

Computer Gaming World also rated the game highly, praising the graphics, AI and gameplay elements as well as calling it a significant improvement over Mechwarrior 2 and its expansion.  The magazine also gave it the Space Simulation of the Year award the following year, as chosen by staff and readers. A reviewer for Next Generation noted the additions of "fully texture-mapped mechs, particle-system explosions, and much more realistic environments" to MechWarrior 2, and was pleased with how the mercenaries structure gives the player greater freedom with respect to choosing missions and other elements. He criticized that building mechs is slow and tedious and the enemy AI is too difficult, but concluded that "Mercenaries is at the top of the mech sim heap, hands down." Trent Ward of GameSpot praised the scenarios, graphics, resource management aspects, voice acting, network play, and mission design, though he felt the music does not hold up over the long play sessions which the game demands. He summarized it as "all you've been waiting for and more."

Mercenaries won the 1996 Spotlight Award for "Best Simulation Game" from the Game Developers Conference.

References

1996 video games
BattleTech games
DOS games
Video games about mecha
MechWarrior
Video games developed in the United States
Video games set in the 31st century
Video games set on fictional planets
Windows games